A Beautiful Mind is a South Korean television series starring Jang Hyuk, Park So-dam, Yoon Hyun-min and Park Se-young. It aired from June 20 to August 8, 2016, on KBS2's Mondays and Tuesdays at 22:00 KST time slot.

Though the drama had its supporters, the number of episodes were brought down to 14, from the planned 16 due to low viewership ratings.

Synopsis
Inspired by Mary Shelley's gothic novel Frankenstein, it tells the story of a world-renowned but unsympathetic neurosurgeon and his involvement with the mysterious deaths in the hospital he works in.

Cast

Main
 Jang Hyuk as Lee Young-oh
36 years old assistant professor at the department of neurology in Hyunsung hospital. He is a genius neurosurgeon who is unable to feel empathy. He is daring and has impeccable observational, deductive and logical skills which he uses to make lightning quick diagnosis. He creates the illusion of an empathy he cannot feel through the reading of minute physiological cues. 
 Park So-dam as Gye Jin-sung 
26 years old traffic policewoman who upholds onto her principles strongly. She is honest, straightforward and rules-sticking.
 Yoon Hyun-min as Hyun Suk-joo  
36 years old cardio-thoracic surgeon who is popular among patients and highly trusted by his colleagues. He's ranked first for being the doctor that patients want to visit the most, the staff that colleagues want to work with the most, and also the senior that juniors wants to take after. 
 Park Se-young as Kim Min-jae
34 years old senior research fellow at the department of neurology in Hyunsung hospital. She graduated from a university at the countryside and came from a disadvantaged background.  She is a lady of both intelligence and looks.
 Huh Joon-ho as Lee Gun-myung 
 58 years old head of cardio cerebrovascular center in Hyunsung Hospital. He is impartial and treats all patients the same.

Supporting
Kim Jong-Soo as Shin Dong-jae – Director of Hyunsung Hospital. Treats Gye Jin-sung as a daughter.
 Oh Jung-se as Kang Hyun-joon – Director of Hyunsung Hospital Foundation. He comes from a rich family and is ambitious.
 Ryu Seung-soo as Kim Myung-soo – Three term assemblyman and aspiring presidential candidate.
 Gong Hyung-jin as No Seung-chan – Team leader of police crime division.
 Min Sung-wook as So Ji-yong – Doctor in department of neurosurgery.
 Lee Jae-ryong as Chae Soon-ho – Assistant Minister for Planning and Coordination, Cardiothoracic Department at Hyunsung Hospital. 
 Shim Yi-young as Kim Yoon-kyung – Doctor in the department of anesthesiology, single mother raising a daughter on her own.
 Ha Jae-sook as Jang Moon-kyung – Nurse, pregnant.
 Kim Do-hyun as Kwon Duk-joong – Associate professor in department of cardiology.
 Kim Hyung-kyu as Yang Sung-eun – Third year resident.
 Jeon Sung-woo as Hong Kyung-soo – Fellow in department of anesthesiology.
 Mori.U as Lee Hye-joo – Nurse.
 Jung Moon-sung as Hwang Jeong-hwan – Associate professor in department of radiology.
 Jo Jae-wan as Oh Kyung-jin – Doctor in department of neurosurgery.
 Jang Ki-yong as Nam Ho-young – Male nurse.
 Lee Sung-wook as Yoo Jang-bae – Doctor in department of neurology.
 Jung Hee-tae as Park Soo-bum  – Traffic police.
 Lee Si-won as Lee Si-hyun – Third year resident.
 Yeon Je-wook as Song Ki-ho – Research fellow in department of thoracic-cardiovascular.
 Woo Jung-gook as Lee Kwang-bok – Technician in Hyunsung Medical Center.
 Yoo Jae-myung as Noh Seung-chan.
 Park Eun-hye as Shim Eun-ha – Pathologist (cameo, ep. 3–5).
 Kim Dae-gon as Kim-min
 Seo Jun-young as Lee Sang-joon – Patient (cameo, ep. 2 and 9).
 Baek Su-ho as teenage Lee Young-oh.
 Park Ha-joon as kid Lee Young-oh.
 Son Jong-hak as Oh Young-bae – President of Green Pharmacy, ex-doctor of Hyunsung Medical Center.
 Jang Hyuk-Jin as Kim Soo-in – Reporter.
 Park Sun-chun as Gye Jin-sung's mother.
 Jo Byeong-kyu as Gye Jin-sung's brother.
 Lee Dong-kyu as Kang Chul-min – traffic accident victim (Ep. 1).
 Ryu Tae-ho as Coroner Yang – pathologist doing Kang Chul-min's autopsy (Ep. 1).
 Bang Dae-han as Dong-joon – Deaf son of Kang Chul-min (Ep. 1).
 Kim Beo-rae as Kang Il-do – Kang Hyun-joon's father.
 Heo Joon-suk as Hong Il-bum – Patient's father (Ep. 3).
 Baek Ji-won as wife of glioblastoma patient (Ep. 6).
 Kang Eui-sik as Doctor in countryside clinic (Ep. 7).
 Kim Da-ye as heart transplant patient (Ep. 7).
 Lee Jae-wook as Patient who refused to admit drinking alcohol after surgery (Ep. 9).
 Hwang Tae-kwang as Choi Sang-hyuk – TV anchorman (Ep. 10).
 Lee Do-hyun as Choi Yo-sub – Choi Sang-hyuk's son (Ep. 10).
 Lee Jae-woo as Jo Yoon-ho – Patient with Ewing's sarcoma in spine (Ep. 12–13).
 Seo Yoon-ah as Jo Yoon-ho's wife  (Ep. 12–13).
 Won Ki-joon as Yum Kyun-ho – Cellist with tumor (Ep. 14).
 Yang Hee-myung as Detective Chun.
 Kim Hyun-sook as secretary.

Original soundtrack

Part 1

Part 2

Ratings

Awards and nominations

References

External links
  
 
 
 

Korean-language television shows
2016 South Korean television series debuts
2016 South Korean television series endings
South Korean medical television series
South Korean mystery television series
Korean Broadcasting System television dramas
Television series by RaemongRaein